Charles Hewitt may refer to:

 Charles Hewitt (rower) (born 1949), American Olympic rower
 Charles Gordon Hewitt (1885–1920), Canadian entomologist and conservation biologist
 Charles J. Hewitt (1867–1940), American businessman, banker and politician from New York

See also
 Charles Hewett (born 1929), American cyclist who competed at the 1960 Summer Olympics
 Charles Thomas Hewett (1794–1871), English-born South Australian pioneer